Vasyl Telychuk (born 13 March 1992) is an alpine skier from Ukraine.

Performances

External links
 
 Vasyl Telychuk at the Ukrainian Ski Federation
 

1992 births
Living people
Ukrainian male alpine skiers